Serravalle Langhe is a comune (municipality) in the Province of Cuneo in the Italian region Piedmont, located about  southeast of Turin and about  northeast of Cuneo.

The municipality of Serravalle Langhe contains the frazione (subdivision) Villa.

Serravalle Langhe borders the following municipalities: Bossolasco, Cerreto Langhe, Cissone, Feisoglio, and Roddino.

Demographic evolution

References

Cities and towns in Piedmont